The Utah High School Activities Association (UHSAA) is an organization of 138 high schools in the U.S. state of Utah that sponsor athletic activities in 25 sports and activities. More than 85,000 students compete annually in approximately 25,000 competitions among UHSAA member schools. The UHSAA is a member of the National Federation of State High School Associations (NFHS).

Sponsored activities

Boys

Girls

Other activities
 Drama
 Music
 Speech and Debate (formerly Forensics)

References

External links

High school sports associations in the United States
Sports in Utah
Organizations established in 2004